Eddie Clayton (born 7 May 1937) is an English former footballer.

Clayton most famously played for Tottenham Hotspur as an inside forward. After graduating from the Spurs academy, he scored twice on his debut in a 4-3 victory over Everton at White Hart Lane in April 1958. However, he served mostly as a stand-in for the more expensive signings of Bill Nicholson's famous 1960s side, making over 100 appearances in the process.

After playing at Southend United he joined non-league Ashford Town (Kent) in 1970 and subsequently went on to captain Margate.

References

1937 births
Living people
Footballers from Bethnal Green
Association football inside forwards
English footballers
Tottenham Hotspur F.C. players
Southend United F.C. players
Ashford United F.C. players
Margate F.C. players
English Football League players